Halima Abubakar (born 12 June 1985) is a Nigerian actress. In 2011, she won the Afro Hollywood Best Actress award.

Personal life
Abubakar was born in Kano but is a descent of Kogi. She attended Ideal primary school in Kano then studied Sociology at Bayero University, Kano. In October 2018, Abubakar revealed that she was still a virgin.

Career
She began acting in 2001 when she played a minor role in Rejected. Her first lead role was in Gangster Paradise. She is also the CEO of a Modehouse Entertainment, a music label and entertainment management company.

Filmography
Slip of Fate
Tears of a Child
Secret Shadows
Gangster Paradise
Area Mama
Men in Love (film)
Love Castle

References

External links

People from Kano State
21st-century Nigerian actresses
Bayero University Kano alumni
Living people
1985 births
Nigerian film actresses
Actresses from Kano State
Nigerian entertainment industry businesspeople
Nigerian chief executives
Nigerian media personalities